Supe Perder is the debut album by Mexican group Los Caminantes, released in 1983. It contains the title track "Supe Perder."

Cover art
Its album cover art is the only cover art which features the four brothers Agustín, Brígido, Horacio and Martín Ramírez together.

Track listing

References
Allmusic page

1983 albums
Los Caminantes albums